Harold Lewis Benjamin was an English cricketer active from 1911 to 1919 who played for Northamptonshire (Northants). He was born in Birmingham on 13 April 1892 and died in Tettenhall, Staffordshire on 7 August 1942. Benjamin appeared in three first-class matches as a righthanded batsman who bowled right arm fast medium pace. He scored 37 runs with a highest score of 23 and took six wickets with a best performance of three for 38.

Notes

1892 births
1942 deaths
English cricketers
Northamptonshire cricketers
Warwickshire cricketers